Events in the year 1733 in Norway.

Incumbents
Monarch: Christian VI

Events

18 July – Christian VI travelled to Trondheim. A poem/speech by Peter Höyer was performed in his honor when he visited the city.

Arts and literature

Construction of Bygdøy Royal Estates  main building is complete.

Births
16 June – Halvor Blinderen, farmer (died 1804).
18 October – Arent Greve, painter and goldsmith (died 1808).

Deaths
Ragnhild Abelset, merchant, landowner and lensmann (born 1660).

See also

References